Bolpebra is a small Bolivian town on the border tripoint with Peru and Brazil, in the Pando Department on the banks of the Acre River. The name of the town is actually a portmanteau of the three countries’ names, Bolivia, Peru and Brazil. The population of Bolpebra is about 400 inhabitants.

The town is located near the Brazil–Peru Integration Bridge.

Populated places in Pando Department
Bolivia–Brazil border
Bolivia–Peru border
Brazil–Peru border